Padma Tiruponithura Venkatraman (born 13 November 1969), also known as T. V. Padma, is an Indian American author. Before she became an award-winning novelist, she spent time on and under the oceans, acted as chief scientist on research vessels, directed a school in England and led diversity efforts at a university.

Early life 
Venkatraman was born in Chennai on 13 November 1969, and studied at The School KFI for most of her life. Even as a child, she loved to write, especially poetry. One of the poems she wrote as a child was published in the inaugural issue of the Delhi London Poetry Quarterly. She also learned to play the Veena from Smt. Savitri Rajan, a disciple of Veenai Dhannammal. Yoga became part of her way of life when she began to practice asana, pranayama and dhyana at around the age of 8 under the direct tutelage and guidance of the legendary yoga teacher, Shri T. Krishnamacharya.

She spent her last two years of school at St. Michael's Academy in Chennai from which she graduated in 1986.  She completed her undergraduate studies at St. Joseph's College, Bangalore in 1989, receiving Bachelor's degrees in Environmental  Science,  Chemistry and Botany. There she enjoyed engaging in community outreach via Rotaract Bangalore Orchards. Venkatraman then spent a year at Brockwood Park School, in the United Kingdom.

Scientific career 
Venkatraman's journey to writing was circuitous. She moved to the United States to pursue graduate studies. She obtained a Master's degree (1990-1994) and a Doctorate (1996-2001) from the Virginia Institute of Marine Science (VIMS), part of the College of William and Mary.  She conducted postdoctoral research in Environmental Engineering at Johns Hopkins University and later worked in Germany (at an institute formerly called Ifm and now known as Geomar), served as head of Inwoods Small School, and taught oceanography in addition to directing directed diversity efforts at the University of Rhode Island.

Writing career

Venkatraman's debut novel, Climbing the Stairs, was released to starred reviews in Booklist, Publishers Weekly and Voice of Youth Advocates (VOYA). The Providence Journal's Sam Coale called it a "fine, often heartbreaking first novel" and pointed out that, although he was not a "young" adult, he loved it and had not realized that it was categorized as such until it was pointed out to him. The novel also received glowing reviews in Kirkus Reviews, School Library Journal, India New England News and India Currents. Climbing the Stairs won the 2009 Julia Ward Howe Award for Young Readers and the ASTAL (Alliance for the Study and Teaching of Adolescent Literature) RI Book of the Year Award and several other honors (ALA/YALSA BBYA; Amelia Bloomer List selection; Bank Street College of Education Best Book; Booklinks Best New Book; Booklist Editor's Choice Best Book; Booksense Notable; Capitol Choice; CCBC choice; CLN Top 25; National Council of Social Studies/Children's Book Center (NCSS/CBC) Notable; NYPL Best Book; PASLA Top 40; PW Flying Start) and was shortlisted for Reading Across Rhode Island, the Cybil awards, and state awards in Maine, Utah, South Carolina and New Jersey.

Venkatraman's second novel, Island' End, was released to starred reviews in Kirkus, Booklist, School Library Journal and Publishers Weekly. It went on to win the international South Asia Book Award, and the Paterson Prize, as well as several honors (Kirkus BBYA; ALA/YALSA BBYA; Booklist Editor's Choice BBYA; CCBC choice, and ALA/Amelia Bloomer selection) and was a finalist for the BAC award and NE-SCBWI's Crystal Kite Award.

Venkatraman's novel in verse, A Time to Dance, was released in May 2014 by Nancy Paulsen Books (an imprint of Penguin Random House) to starred reviews in 5 journals (Kirkus, Booklist, Voices of Youth Advocates, Bulletin of the Center for Children's Books and School Library Journal); received glowing reviews in newspapers (such as the Denver Post, Chicago Sun-Times, Newsday and Providence Journal); and accumulated numerous awards and honors (e.g. American Library Association (ALA) Notable; ALA/Young Adult Library Association (YALSA) Best Book for Young Adults (BBYA), Booklist Top 10 art book for youth; Booklist Editor's Choice BBYA; Bookworm Central Top 40; Cooperative Children's Book Center (CCBC) choice; Center for the Study of Multicultural Literature (CSML) Best Book; Eliot Rosewater Award (IN) finalist;  Forever Literary Top 10 Character Driven Books; International Board on Books for Young People (IBBY) Outstanding Book for Young People with Disabilities; International Reading Association (IRA) Notable Books for a Global Society; IndieBound selection; Kirkus BBYA; Mighty Girl Best Books of the year; New York Public Library (NYPL) Top 25).

In 2019, Venkatraman's The Bridge Home fourth novel for young people was released by Nancy Paulsen Books (an imprint of Penguin Random House) to starred reviews in School Library Journal, Booklist, Kirkus, Publishers Weekly and School Library Connection. She also read the audiobook herself, and it was so successful that she was later asked to read the audiobook version of A Time To Dance. The Bridge Home Audiobook was a Junior Library Guild selection and won Audiophile Magazine's Earphone Award.

Additional Awards and Honors 
In 2009, Padma Venkatraman was a finalist for India New England's Woman of the Year Award. In 2008, her dedication to writing magazine articles for children was rewarded when she won the SCBWI Magazine Merit Award for Nonfiction. Prior to that, one of her earliest published works, The Cleverest Thief, published by August House was awarded a Storytelling World Honor.

Speaker and Teacher 
Venkatraman has participated on panels at Harvard and other universities; provided commencement speeches at schools and keynote addresses at numerous conferences (including an upcoming keynote at NCTE); and been invited to attend international book festivals such as the PEN World Voices Festival, the Hong Kong Author Festival and the Caribbean Beach Pen Literary Festival (in Trinidad), where she was the chief guest. Her work has been featured nationally and internationally on TV and radio. Her speaking agency is the Author Village.

References

External links

1969 births
Living people
American children's writers
Writers from Rhode Island
St. Joseph's College, Bangalore alumni
College of William & Mary alumni